Grunwald is a surname. Notable people with the surname include:

Al Grunwald (1930–2011), American baseball player
Anatole de Grunwald (1910–1967), Russian-born British film producer and screenwriter
Ash Grunwald (born 1976), Australian blues singer 
Dimitri de Grunwald (1914–1990), Russian-born British film producer
Glen Grunwald (born 1958), Canadian attorney and basketball executive
Henry Grunwald (editor) (1922–2005), American journalist and diplomat
Lisa Grunwald (born 1959), American author
Ludwig Grünwald, (1863–1927), German otolaryngologist
Michael Grunwald (born 1970), American journalist and author
Morten Grunwald  (1934–2018), Danish actor, stage director and theatre manager
Wilhelm Grunwald (1909–1989), German mathematician

See also
 Greenwald